is a Japanese manga series written and illustrated by Hisashi Sakaguchi, based on the life of the 14th century Zen monk Ikkyū. Set during the tumultuous Muromachi period, the manga focuses on Ikkyū's spiritual struggles and transformation into an unorthodox, wandering monk. The story combines and truncates many of the facts and fictions of Ikkyū's life and draws influence from Noh theatre.

It was serialized in the Monthly Afternoon magazine by Kodansha from 1993-1996, left unfinished when Sakaguchi died from acute heart failure at the age of 49. The manga received the Japan Cartoonists Association Award posthumously.

Plot

Bastard son of Emperor Go-Komatsu, Ikkyū is given to the Ankokuji Temple in Kyoto for his own safety. Ardent in his studies of Zen, Ikkyu is a clever boy who becomes tired of the hypocrisy surrounding him at the Ankokuji. Wandering the cities and backcountry of Japan, Ikkyu develops a legendary reputation as both an ascetic and libertine monk.

References

External links
 

Seinen manga